William Samuel Murphy (12 February 1882 – 29 April 1961) was an Independent Conservative member of the House of Commons of Canada. He was born in Portland, Ontario and became a physician.

Murphy attended public school at Portland, then secondary school at Athens, Ontario before further studies at Queen's University where he earned his Bachelor of Arts and Doctor of Medicine (MD, CM) degrees. He settled in Smiths Falls, Ontario where he became a director of Northern Buttons Ltd. and from 1916 to 1918 served as that town's mayor.

He was first elected to Parliament at the Lanark riding in a by-election on 29 July 1929. After serving for the remainder of the 16th Canadian Parliament, Murphy was defeated in the 1930 federal election by Thomas Alfred Thompson of the Conservatives.

References

External links
 

1882 births
1961 deaths
Physicians from Ontario
Independent Conservative MPs in the Canadian House of Commons
Mayors of places in Ontario
Members of the House of Commons of Canada from Ontario
People from Smiths Falls
People from Leeds and Grenville United Counties
Queen's University at Kingston alumni